Stefan Marian Kaczmarz (March 20, 1895 in Sambor, Galicia, Austria-Hungary – 1939) was a Polish mathematician.  His Kaczmarz method provided the basis for many modern imaging technologies, including the CAT scan.

Kaczmarz was a professor of mathematics in the faculty of mechanical engineering of  Jan Kazimierz University of Lwów from 1919 to 1939, where he collaborated with Stefan Banach.

The circumstances of Kaczmarz's death are unclear. In early September 1939, after World War II broke out, he was called up for Polish military service as a reserve lieutenant. He sent a letter to his wife on 4 September and was not heard from afterwards. Theories for his death include the possibility that he died soon after near Nisko (the source of his last letter to his wife) in a German bombing raid on a train he was traveling in, that he died later that month in combat against the Germans near Umiastów, or that he was murdered by the NKVD in April or May 1940 as part of the Katyń massacre.

References

External links
 Biography of Stefan Kaczmarz (in Polish)

1895 births
1939 deaths
Lwów School of Mathematics
Polish military personnel killed in World War II